Joseph Alexander McChristian (October 12, 1914 – May 13, 2005) was a United States Army Major General and the assistant chief of staff for intelligence, Military Assistance Command, Vietnam (J-2, MACV) (then commanded by General William Westmoreland) from July 13, 1965 to June 1, 1967. As J-2, MACV, he predicted that the North Vietnamese would attack in full force, which they did during the 1968 Tet offensive. His prediction was unpopular because the official policy was that US and South Vietnamese forces were winning the war.

Early life and education
Born in Chicago, Illinois and raised in Miami, Florida, McChristian enlisted in the Army on July 2, 1933. He was subsequently appointed to the United States Military Academy, earning a B.S. degree in 1939. McChristian later graduated from the Armed Forces Staff College in 1951 and the Army War College in 1955.

Military career
During World War II, McChristian served with the 10th Armored Division in Europe earning a Silver Star Medal and four Bronze Star Medals.

From 1949 to 1950, McChristian was a member of the Joint Military Assistance Group in Greece. During the Korean War, he served on the faculty at the Military Academy. After learning Greek, McChristian returned to Greece as Army attaché from 1956 to 1960.

From August 5, 1968 to his retirement on April 30, 1971, as a Major General, he was assistant chief of staff for intelligence in the Department of the Army.

McChristian received two Distinguished Service Medals and the Legion of Merit. He is a member of the Military Intelligence Hall of Fame.

Personal
McChristian was the son of Robert Lee McChristian Sr. (February 14, 1888 – September 9, 1955) and Lillian (Alexander) Stone (August 28, 1892 – September 28, 1971). They were married on June 7, 1910 in New York City, but were divorced in 1929. The family moved to Chicago after their first son was born, and then to Miami after their third son was born. McChristian's older brother Robert Lee McChristian Jr. (August 1, 1912 – August 22, 1995) worked in the sport fishing industry and invented a fishing reel mechanism, while his younger brother Stanley Earl McChristian (February 10, 1918 – June 18, 2018) was a World War II veteran and retired Air Force major.

After his death in Jupiter, Florida, McChristian was buried at Arlington National Cemetery on July 29, 2005. His wife Dempsie Catherine (Van Fleet) McChristian (August 15, 1918 – April 1, 2013) was interred beside him eight years later. She was the daughter of General James A. Van Fleet.

Notes

References

Major General Joseph A. McChristian, The Role of Military Intelligence 1965-1967 (Vietnam Studies), Department of the Army, Washington DC, 1974 (Library of Congress Catalogue Card number 74-600003)
Jake Blood, The Tet Effect: Intelligence and the Public Perception of War (Cass Military Studies)  Routledge 2005. 

1914 births
2005 deaths
Military personnel from Chicago
People from Miami
United States Army soldiers
United States Military Academy alumni
United States Army personnel of World War II
Recipients of the Silver Star
Joint Forces Staff College alumni
United States Military Academy faculty
United States Army War College alumni
United States military attachés
Recipients of the Legion of Merit
United States Army generals
United States Army personnel of the Vietnam War
Recipients of the Air Medal
Recipients of the Distinguished Service Medal (US Army)
Burials at Arlington National Cemetery